Damon Anthony Dash (born May 3, 1971) is an American entrepreneur and record executive. Dash is best known as co-founder of Roc-A-Fella along with Jay-Z and Kareem Burke.

Early life 
Born in New York City, Dash swept the floors of a local barbershop and sold newspapers in order to buy sneakers and shirts as a teenager. Dash "learned to hustle", in his own words, from the example of his mother, who died of an asthma attack when he was 15. The same year, Dash was diagnosed with type 1 diabetes. "Before I was diagnosed... I went about a month or two just going to the bathroom non-stop and losing weight," Dash recalled. "Magic Johnson had just been diagnosed with AIDS, so that’s what I thought I had. I was scared to even go to the doctor. I thought I was going to die."

Career 
Dash served as Jay-Z's manager and business partner at Roc-A-Fella Records, and in 1999, he organized a tour for Jay-Z which made $19 million. Their relationship soured as a result of two subsequent events. The first was when Roc-A-Fella Records was purchased by Def Jam Recordings (which had previously only owned half of the company) in 2004, after which Jay-Z agreed to take a job as Def Jam's president. Then, in late 2005, Jay-Z bought Dash out of his stake in Rocawear.

In April 2014, it was announced that Dash is involved with Blind Debit, a fingerprint payment application being developed by Dez White.

Dash founded DD172, a media collective which encompasses: America Nu, a magazine; VNGRD79, a web design firm; BluRoc Records, a record label division. It also includes an art gallery.

Personal life

Dash met R&B singer Aaliyah in New York City in the summer of 2000 through his accountant,  and dated her until her death on August 25, 2001, in a plane crash in The Bahamas. Though they were not formally engaged, in interviews given after Aaliyah's death, Dash stated that the couple had planned to marry.

In 2005, Dash married fashion designer Rachel Roy, whom he had dated prior to his relationship with Aaliyah. They met when she was working as an intern at Rocawear. Together they have two daughters, Ava Dash (born December 7, 1999) and Tallulah Dash (born May 14, 2008). Following their divorce in 2009, they had a bitter custody battle.

Dash has a son, Dame "Boogie" Dash (born November 28, 1991), with former girlfriend Linda Williams. Boogie stars in the reality television show Growing Up Hip Hop. He also has another son, Lucky, born in 2004 with Cindy Morales.

Dash and his fiancée Raquel Horn have a son, Dusko Dash, born on November 14, 2020.

Legal issues 
In 2012, rapper Curren$y sued Dash for $1.5 million for releasing his music without permission. Dash's attorney released a statement that Dash released the music on fair grounds.

In 2014, Dash was ordered to pay Linda Williams, the mother of his son Boogie, $50,000 for causing her to be prosecuted on harassment charges in 2009.

In April 2015, Dash's ex-wife, Rachel Roy, accused him of domestic abuse and filed for a restraining order. Roy was awarded sole custody of their daughters. The court granted Roy and her daughters with a three-year restraining order against Dash. Days later, Dash filed a $2.5 million claim against Roy in asserted damage for allegedly mishandling their joint fashion business, Royale Etenia.

In 2018, Dash settled a suit he filed against director Lee Daniels requesting $5 million to recoup a $2 million investment with interest. Lee had received financial support from Dash early in his career, and reportedly failed to repay him despite his subsequent success.

In November 2019, Dash was arrested for failing to pay more than $400,000 in child support. Dash was in New York City for an unrelated Federal Court appearance when he was arrested for two warrants. The first warrant was issued in April 2015 in the Supreme Court in New York County case of Cindy Morales; he owed $62,553 since 2012. The second warrant was issued in March 2019 in the Bronx Family Court case of Rachel Roy. He was ordered to pay her $341,991 and $25,000 for attorney fees in 2015. Dash reportedly paid more than $1 million to be released.

References

External links 

1971 births
Living people
African-American businesspeople
African-American record producers
American cosmetics businesspeople
American fashion businesspeople
American hip hop record producers
American music industry executives
American music managers
Businesspeople from New York City
Nightclub owners
People from Harlem
People with type 1 diabetes
Record producers from New York (state)
21st-century African-American people
20th-century African-American people